Goldbach is a river of Mecklenburg-Vorpommern, Germany. It is a tributary of the Tollense.

See also
List of rivers of Mecklenburg-Vorpommern

Rivers of Mecklenburg-Western Pomerania
Rivers of Germany